The Jurnal Trust Media trust is a Moldovan group of media companies.

Overview 

The most known company of the group is Jurnal TV. Besides the central office in Chişinău, the channel is working to open representations in Bălţi and Cahul.

The head of Jurnal Trust Media is Val Butnaru. The Trust comprises also newspapers Jurnal de Chişinău, ECOnomist, Apropo Magazin, and radio station Jurnal FM. Its headquarters are in Chişinău.

References

External links
 www.jurnal.md 
 Jurnal tv.md 
 Moldova launching its first News TV channel
 Jurnal Trust Media launches the first television news in Romanian 
 Declaration of Val Butnaru, director Jurnal Trust Media, 09.04.09

 
Mass media in Chișinău